Coprophilus (from Greek 'dung-loving') is, with about 30 species, a relatively small genus of staphylinid beetles. They are confined to temperate regions of the Northern Hemisphere. These species occur near herbivore dungs as well as decaying plant matters, hence their generic name.

References 

Staphylinidae genera
Oxytelinae